Narayana Reddy or Narayana Reddi may refer to:
 C. Narayana Reddy (1931–2017), Indian poet and writer
 G. Narayan Reddy (1926 – 1998), an Indian politician and Member of Parliament of India. 
 Raavi Narayana Reddy (1908–1991), Indian communist Freedom Fighter
 Narayana Reddy, central figure of the YouTube channel Grandpa Kitchen
 Varthur Narayana Reddy, notable organic farmer and organic farming crusader from South India.

Masculine given names